The National Confederation of Senegalese Workers (CNTS) is a national trade union center in Senegal, It was founded in 1969 and has a membership of 60,000.

The CNTS is affiliated with the International Trade Union Confederation.

References

External links
 CNTS official site.

Trade unions in Senegal
International Trade Union Confederation
National federations of trade unions
International League of Peoples' Struggle
Trade unions established in 1969